Guntis Rēķis (born 3 November 1974) is a Latvian luger who has competed since 1997. He won two bronze medals in the mixed team event at the FIL World Luge Championships, earning them in 2008 and 2009.

Competing in three Winter Olympics, Rēķis earned his best finish of 21st in the men's singles event at Turin in 2006.

References
 2002 luge men's singles results at todor66.com

External links
 
 
 
 

1974 births
Living people
Latvian male lugers
Olympic lugers of Latvia
Lugers at the 1998 Winter Olympics
Lugers at the 2002 Winter Olympics
Lugers at the 2006 Winter Olympics
Lugers at the 2010 Winter Olympics
Sportspeople from Riga